= Champa Biswas rape case =

The Champa Biswas rape case refers to the regular rape of the wife of an IAS officer in Bihar between 1995 and 1997. Politician Hemlata Yadav and her son were convicted for the crime.
